Gioffre Borgia (1481/82–1516/17), also known as Goffredo (Italian), or Jofré Borja (Valencian), was the youngest son of Pope Alexander VI and Vannozza dei Cattanei, and a member of the House of Borgia. He was the youngest brother of Cesare, Giovanni, and Lucrezia Borgia.

Early relations 
Gioffre married Sancha of Aragon, natural daughter of Alfonso II of Naples, obtaining as dowry both the Principality of Squillace (1494), and after a period of political turmoil in the Kingdom of Naples, the Duchy of Alvito (1497).

Gioffre and Sancha were 12 and 16, respectively, at the time of their marriage. The marriage was a political one. Alfonso married his daughter to Gioffre and gave the over-large dowry in return for Pope Alexander's recognition of Alfonso's claim to the throne of Naples. Almost as soon as the wedding ceremony was over, the political situation changed with the invasion of Italy by King Charles VIII of France, who claimed Naples as his own. Alfonso fled, leaving the throne to his short-lived son, and a long war between Spain, France and their Italian adherents ensued.

During this time the young couple lived mostly at Rome, where Sancha reputedly had affairs with both of her husband's elder brothers, Giovanni and Cesare, among others. In the beginning of their marriage, Sancha was somewhat domineering over her husband and she sought after older men.

Gioffre's relationship with his father was poor. Pope Alexander VI legitimized him, but privately expressed doubts that  Gioffre was his son. He considered him a weakling because of his lack of interest in politics. In 1497 the Pope publicly exonerated Gioffre of the murder of his brother Giovanni Borgia, 2nd Duke of Gandia because of the many rumours that Cesare was in fact the killer, due to public antagonism between the two over Sancha.

Later life 
During the War of 14991504, when Louis XII of France attempted to conquer Naples, Gioffre sided with the French; but when he was captured by Prospero Colonna he changed sides to join the Spanish, which caused a rebellion in Alvito.  In 1504 he sent the condottiero Fabrizio Colonna to stabilise his lands, partly paid for with money he had appropriated from the papal treasury after the death of his father the year before.  With the rebellion crushed, Gioffre finally moved to his estates in Alvito and Squillace in 1504.

Two years later Sancha died childless. Consequently, the Spanish King of Naples, Ferdinand II of Aragon, took possession of Gioffre's estates in Alvito. However, Gioffre was able to retain Squillace, on the Calabrian coast, which he ruled as a feudal vassal of Naples.

Gioffre's second marriage was to one of his cousins, Maria de Mila of Aragon.  They had a son, Francesco, and three daughters: Lucrezia, Antonia and Maria Borgia. Francesco inherited his father's lands and the title of Prince of Squillace. Gioffre's descendants ruled the city of Squillace until 1735. They generally ruled through governors, since they resided at either Naples or the Spanish court.

Representations in popular culture

Art 

Gioffre and Sancha are generally thought to have been the models for the boy and girl in the artist Pinturicchio's Disputation of St Catherine, where they are depicted as a young couple in love.

Television
 In the 1981 BBC mini-series, The Borgias,  Jofré is played by British Actor Louis Selwyn.
 In the 2011 Showtime series The Borgias, Joffré is played by British actor Aidan Alexander. The role was a minor one, and he only appeared in the first season.
 In the 2011 Canal+ series Borgia, Goffredo is played by Czech actor Adam Misík in the first and second seasons. In the third and final season, the role is played by Italian actor Niccolò Besio. In this series, his son Francesco is depicted as being the bastard son of his first wife Sancia from her affair with his brother Juan, as opposed to being his own legitimate son by his second wife, Maria de Mila.

Notes

References

1482 births
1517 deaths
Italian Roman Catholics
Italian people of Spanish descent
Italian princes
Gioffre
Illegitimate children of Pope Alexander VI